The Spleen is one of the zàng organs stipulated by traditional Chinese medicine (TCM). It is a functionally defined entity and not equivalent to the anatomical organ of the same name.

In the context of the zang-fu concept
As a zàng, the Spleen is considered to be a yin organ. Its associated yang organ is the Stomach. Both Spleen and Stomach are attributed to the Earth element.

Regarding its stipulated functions, the Spleen
governs "transportation and absorption", i.e. the extraction of jīng weī (lit. "essence bits", usually translated with food essence, sometimes also called jīng qì [, essence qi]) – and water – from food and drink, and the successive distribution of it to the other zàng organs.
the jīng weī constitutes a large part of the body's acquired qì (the other part coming from breathing, by facilitation of the Lung zàng). In this spirit, the Spleen is also called "root of the postnatal" – as opposed to the congenital qì, which is stored by the Kidney zàng. The Spleen absorbs jīng weī from the food after it has been preprocessed by the Stomach and the Small Intestine, and then distributes it to the whole body, especially upwards to the Lung and Heart, where jīng weī is transformed into qì and xuě (blood). Thus, TCM also describes the Spleen as the source of "production and mutual transformation" of qì and xuě.
the Spleen distributes the water extracted from the food and distributes it to the whole of the body, especially to the Lung and Kidney zàng, and thus assists the body's water metabolism.
"contains" the blood inside the vessels (this is also one of the functions of qì)
governs muscles and limbs
opens into the lips (and mouth)
houses the yì ("thinking")
governs pondering
Its associated body fluid is saliva.
The Spleen's function (i.e., the Spleen-qì) is said to be strongest between 9 and 11am.  
When the Spleen is functioning well, digestion will be good, the muscles will be strong and circulation will be efficient.  Dysfunction of the Spleen typically presents as diarrhea, malnutrition, edema, weak/atrophic muscles, greasy taste in the mouth, or excessive bleeding. The Spleen is especially weakened by the Pathogenic Factor Dampness.

Notes

References
 (2006-07-18), "", retrieved 2010-12-18
Cultural China (2007), "Chinese Medicine : Basic Zang Fu Theory", Kaleidoscope → Health, retrieved 2010-12-21

Further reading 
 
 

Traditional Chinese medicine
Spleen (anatomy)